Sealed Lips is a 1942 American film.

Sealed Lips may also refer to:

 Sealed Lips (1925 film), an American silent film
 Sealed Lips (1927 film), a Swedish silent film

See also
 My Lips Are Sealed (disambiguation)